
Gmina Lipka is a rural gmina (administrative district) in Złotów County, Greater Poland Voivodeship, in west-central Poland.

Villages
Gmina Lipka contains the villages and settlements of Batorówko, Batorowo, Białobłocie, Bługowo, Czyżkówko, Czyżkowo, Debrzno-Wieś, Huta, Kiełpin, Łąkie, Łąkie-Gogolin, Laskowo, Lipka, Mały Buczek, Nowe Potulice, Nowy Buczek, Osowo, Potulice, Scholastykowo, Smolnica, Stołuńsko, Trudna and Wielki Buczek.

Neighbouring gminas
Gmina Lipka is bordered by the gminas of Debrzno, Okonek, Sępólno Krajeńskie, Więcbork, Zakrzewo and Złotów.

See also

References
Polish official population figures 2006

Lipka
Złotów County